Ilie Năstase and Yannick Noah were the defending champions but only Nastase competed that year with Adriano Panatta.

Nastase and Panatta lost in the semifinals to Jay Lapidus and Richard Meyer.

Brian Gottfried and Bruce Manson won in the final 6–4, 6–2 against Lapidus and Meyer.

Seeds
Champion seeds are indicated in bold text while text in italics indicates the round in which those seeds were eliminated.

 Brian Gottfried /  Bruce Manson (champions)
 Tracy Delatte /  Mel Purcell (quarterfinals)
 Bernard Mitton /  Danie Visser (semifinals)
 Ilie Năstase /  Adriano Panatta (semifinals)

Draw

External links
 1982 Paris Open Doubles draw

Doubles